Albert Junior Hillyard Andrew Mendes (born 15 September 1976) is an English-born Montserratian former professional footballer and sports scientist who works a fitness coach for Scottish Premiership side St. Mirren.

As a player he was a striker from 1995 to 2015. Mendes began his career with Premier League side Chelsea in 1995, but was released at the 95–96 season. He went on to play in the Football League for Carlisle United, Mansfield Town, Huddersfield Town, Northampton Town, Grimsby Town, Notts County, Lincoln City and Aldershot Town, in Scotland with St Mirren, Dunfermline Athletic and Ayr United, and in English Non-league football with Stevenage Borough and Ilkeston Town. He has represented Montserrat six times, scoring 1 goal.

Club career
He signed for Stevenage Borough in March 2009 on loan until the end of the 2008–09 season. He had a trial with Conference team York City in October 2009, before signing as stand in for one game on non-contract terms for Conference North club Ilkeston Town, to play against Cambridge United in the FA Cup First Round. Mendes signed for Scottish Football League First Division club Ayr United in November 2009, until mid-January.

Mendes signed for Clydebank in November 2014.

Personal life
Mendes studied at University of the West of Scotland completing a MRes in Sport and exercise Science in 2018. Mendes works as a sports scientist and has been employed as a fitness coach by Scottish League One club Partick Thistle since 2015.

References

External links

1976 births
Footballers from Balham
Living people
English footballers
Montserratian footballers
Montserrat international footballers
British people of Montserratian descent
Association football forwards
Chelsea F.C. players
St Mirren F.C. players
Carlisle United F.C. players
Mansfield Town F.C. players
Dunfermline Athletic F.C. players
Huddersfield Town A.F.C. players
Northampton Town F.C. players
Grimsby Town F.C. players
Notts County F.C. players
Lincoln City F.C. players
Aldershot Town F.C. players
Stevenage F.C. players
Ilkeston Town F.C. (1945) players
Ayr United F.C. players
Nairn County F.C. players
Clydebank F.C. players
Scottish Premier League players
Scottish Football League players
English Football League players
National League (English football) players
Black British sportsmen
Scottish Junior Football Association players

Alumni of the University of the West of Scotland